Rich Chrismer (born April 9, 1946) is an American politician who served in the Missouri House of Representatives from the 16th district from 1993 to 2001.

References

1946 births
Living people
Republican Party members of the Missouri House of Representatives